Vassilis Dimitriadis (born 22 August 1978 in Belgium) is a retired alpine ski racer from Greece and the former Head coach of Greek National Ski Team.  He competed for Greece at the 1998 Winter Olympics, 2002 Winter Olympics, 2006 Winter Olympics and the 2010 Winter Olympics.  His best result was a 23rd place in the slalom in 2006.

References

External links

1978 births
Living people
Greek male alpine skiers
Olympic alpine skiers of Greece
Alpine skiers at the 1998 Winter Olympics
Alpine skiers at the 2002 Winter Olympics
Alpine skiers at the 2006 Winter Olympics
Alpine skiers at the 2010 Winter Olympics
Sportspeople from Brussels